Ristella beddomii, commonly known as Beddome's cat skink and Beddome's ristella, is a species of skink, a lizard in the family Scincidae. The species is native to southwestern India.

Etymology
R. beddomii is named after Richard Henry Beddome (1830–1911), who was a British army officer and botanist.

Description

The ear-opening is larger than the nostril. There is a single azygos prefrontal, nearly as large as the frontonasal. The fourth to sixth upper labials are located below the eye. The body is much shorter than in the other species of the genus, and the adpressed limbs meet or slightly overlap. The dorsal scales are sharply bicarinate. There are 26 scales round the middle of the body. R. beddomii is reddish brown above, with or without 2 or 3 lighter dorsal streaks. The sides have scattered minute whitish dots. There is usually a black blotch with a few white dots above the axilla. The lower surfaces are uniform whitish.

All claws are completely retractile, each into a scale sheath.

Geographic range
R. beddomii is found in India (Tenmalai, Travancore, Sharavati River, N Kanara district, Parambikulam).

Habitat

Reproduction
R. beddomei is an oviparous species. Egg laying coincides with the southwestern monsoons. An adult female may lay a clutch of up to 3 eggs. Each egg measures about  x .

References

Further reading
Boulenger GA (1887). Catalogue of the Lizards in the British Museum (Natural History). Second Edition. Volume III. ... Scincidæ ... London: Trustees of the British Museum (Natural History). (Taylor and Francis, printers). xii + 575 pp. + Plates I-XL. (Ristella beddomii, new species, p. 359 + Plate XXIX, Figures 4, 4a).
Smith MA (1935). The Fauna of British India, Including Ceylon and Burma. Vol. II.—Sauria. London: Secretary of State for India in Council. (Taylor and Francis, printers). xiii + 440 pp. + Plate I + 2 maps. (Ristella beddomii, p. 332).

Ristella
Reptiles described in 1887
Taxa named by George Albert Boulenger